Parshuram Megi Gurung (Nepali: परशु राम मेघी गुरुङ) is a Nepalese communist politician and member of the National Assembly. In 2018 he was elected unopposed in Province No. 1 for the Communist Party of Nepal (Unified Marxist–Leninist) with a four-year term.

References 

Nepal Communist Party (NCP) politicians
Members of the National Assembly (Nepal)
Communist Party of Nepal (Unified Marxist–Leninist) politicians
Year of birth missing (living people)
Living people
Nepal MPs 1991–1994
Nepal MPs 1999–2002
Gurung people